Gaylord Jackson Perry (September 15, 1938 – December 1, 2022) was an American right-handed pitcher in Major League Baseball (MLB) who played for eight teams from 1962 to 1983, becoming one of the most durable and successful pitchers in history. A five-time All-Star, Perry was the first pitcher to win the Cy Young Award in both leagues. He won the American League (AL) award in 1972 after leading the league with 24 wins with a 1.92 earned run average (ERA) for the fifth-place Cleveland Indians, and took the National League (NL) award in 1978 with the San Diego Padres after again leading the league with 21 wins; his Cy Young Award announcement just as he turned the age of 40 made him the oldest to win the award, which stood as a record for 26 years. He and his older brother Jim, who were Cleveland teammates in 1974–1975, became the first brothers to both win 200 games in the major leagues, and remain the only brothers to both win Cy Young Awards.

Perry gained notoriety for doctoring baseballs (e.g. throwing spitballs), and perhaps even more so for making batters think he was throwing them on a regular basis—he went so far as to title his 1974 autobiography Me and the Spitter, though he claimed that his use of the prohibited practice was in the past. He was the subject of two decades of controversy during which opposing managers, umpires and league officials frequently attempted to catch him in a violation, even revising rules and guidelines; despite the constant scrutiny, he was not ejected from a game for the practice until his 21st season in the majors in 1982. In the meantime, Perry firmly established himself as one of baseball's most accomplished pitchers. He won 20 games five times and struck out 200 batters eight times, leading his league in innings pitched and complete games twice each. He pitched a no-hitter in September 1968, three weeks after throwing a one-hitter, and also pitched thirteen career two-hitters. In 1978 Perry became the third pitcher to register 3,000 strikeouts, and while pitching for the Seattle Mariners in 1982, he became the first pitcher in 19 years to reach the 300-win plateau; he joined Walter Johnson to become only the second pitcher to reach both milestones.

During a 22-year career, with most of its second half spent with losing teams, Perry compiled 314 wins; upon his retirement, he ranked third in major league history with 3,534 strikeouts. with his 690 games started placing him behind only Cy Young's 815. His 5,350 innings pitched ranked fourth; he had been the first right-handed pitcher since the 1920s to surpass 5,000 innings. He was the last pitcher to throw 300 complete games, and was then the eighth-oldest pitcher ever to start a major league game. Perry was elected to the Baseball Hall of Fame in 1991 in his third year of eligibility, a delay widely regarded as resulting from his career-long controversies.

Early life
Gaylord Perry was born in Williamston, North Carolina, and named after a close friend of his father's, who had died while having his teeth pulled.

Gaylord was the son of Evan and Ruby Perry, who were farmers. Evan Perry had been a noted athlete. Gaylord grew up with his older brother Jim and younger sister Carolyn in Williamston and the small area of Farmlife, a populated place located within the Township of Griffins, a minor division of Martin County. Gaylord assisted his father with farming on their family's land in this area. Jim and Gaylord both began playing baseball with their father during their lunch break on the farm as youths.

Gaylord attended Williamston High School, where he played football, basketball, and baseball. He was All-State as an offensive and defensive end as a sophomore and junior, before giving up football. In basketball, Gaylord and Jim helped Williamston to reach the state finals in Gaylord's first year. In his career at Williamston, Gaylord averaged nearly 30 points and 20 rebounds per game, as Williamston had a 94–8 record. He would turn down dozens of college basketball scholarship offers.

In baseball, Perry initially was a third baseman as a freshman, and Jim was the pitcher for Williamston. However, near the end of Gaylord's first year, he began sharing pitching duties with Jim. In 1955 Williamston High won the North Carolina Class A state tournament, as the Perry brothers threw back-to-back shutouts to sweep the best-of-three finals. Gaylord had a 33–5 win-loss record in his high school career.

As a teenager, Perry played semi-professional baseball for the Alpine Cowboys in Alpine, Texas at Kokernot Field. Perry and his brother both attended Campbell University, where they played college baseball.

Pitching style
Perry claims he was taught the spitball in 1964 by pitcher Bob Shaw. Perry had a reputation throughout his career for doctoring baseballs, and was inspected on the mound by umpires and monitored closely by opposing teams. On August 23, 1982, he was ejected from a game against the Boston Red Sox for doctoring the ball for the first and only time of his career; he was suspended for 10 days.

Perry reportedly approached the makers of Vaseline about endorsing the product and was allegedly rebuffed with a one-line postcard reading, "We soothe babies' backsides, not baseballs."  Former manager Gene Mauch famously quipped "He should be in the Hall of Fame with a tube of K-Y Jelly attached to his plaque."

Gene Tenace, who caught Gaylord Perry when they played for the San Diego Padres, said: "I can remember a couple of occasions when I couldn't throw the ball back to him because it was so greasy that it slipped out of my hands. I just walked out to the mound and flipped the ball back to him."

Perry used his reputation to psych out the hitters too. As he looked in to his catcher for the pitch selection, Perry would touch various parts of his head, such as his eyebrows and his cap. In this manner, he may or may not have been applying a foreign substance to the ball on any particular pitch. Reggie Jackson was so upset after striking out against Perry in a 1982 game that Jackson was ejected from the game. Jackson returned from the dugout with a container of Gatorade, splashing Gatorade onto the field while yelling at the umpire that Perry should be allowed to use the Gatorade on the baseball.

The spitball was not his only method for upsetting batters. Sports Illustrateds Joe Posnanski wrote of Perry, "My favorite trick pitch of his was the old Puffball, where he would load up on rosin so that a puff of white smoke would release while he threw his pitches. This was made illegal somewhere along the way (because of Perry, of course), but it's so awesome—it's like the sort of thing one of the villains on the old Batman TV show would do."

Professional career

Minor leagues

The San Francisco Giants signed Perry on June 3, 1958, for $90,000 per year. He made his professional debut in the 1958 season with the St. Cloud Rox team in the Class A level Northern League, compiling a 9–5 record and a 2.39 earned run average (ERA).

In 1959, the Giants promoted Perry to the Class AA Corpus Christi Giants, where he posted a 10–11 record and 4.05 ERA. He remained with the franchise as they became the Rio Grande Valley Giants in the 1960 season, and an improved ERA of 2.82 earned him a promotion to the Class AAA Tacoma Giants for the 1961 season. At Tacoma, he led the Pacific Coast League in wins and innings pitched in 1961.

San Francisco Giants (1962–1971)
Perry made his major league debut with the Giants on April 14, 1962, against the Cincinnati Reds. He appeared in 13 games for the Giants, but had a 2–1 record and a 5.23 ERA and was sent back down to Tacoma in June, going on to lead the PCL with a 2.44 ERA. He was promoted back to the Giants in September, but was not on the roster for the team's World Series appearance; it would be the only time in his career that he pitched for a pennant winner.

After his brief call-up in 1962, Perry joined the Giants in 1963 to work mostly as a relief pitcher, posting a mediocre 4.03 ERA in 31 appearances. Nevertheless, in 1964 he was given the opportunity to join the starting rotation, finishing with a 2.75 ERA and a 12–11 record, both second-best for the Giants that year behind Juan Marichal. In 1965, his record was 8–12, and with two full seasons as a starter, his 24–30 record attracted little national attention.

Perry's breakout season came in 1966 with a tremendous start, going 20–2 into August. Perry and Marichal became known as a "1–2 punch" to rival the famous Koufax/Drysdale combination of the Los Angeles Dodgers. While Marichal was NL Player of the Month in May, Perry was so named in June (5–0, 0.90 ERA, 31 strikeouts). He played in his first All-Star game, but after August, he slumped the rest of the season, finishing 21–8, and the Giants finished second to the Dodgers. Marichal missed much of the 1967 season with a leg injury, and Perry was thrust into the role of team ace. While he finished the season with a disappointing 15–17 record, he had a low ERA and allowed only seven hits per nine innings pitched.

Perry had similar numbers in 1968: he posted a 16–15 record, but with a then-career-best 2.45 ERA on a Giants team that finished second to the St. Louis Cardinals. On September 17 of that year, two days after his 30th birthday, Perry threw a 1–0 no-hitter against the Cardinals and Bob Gibson at Candlestick Park. The lone run came on a first-inning home run by light-hitting Ron Hunt—the second of the only two he hit that season. The next day, Ray Washburn of the Cardinals no-hit the Giants, winning 2–0, and marking the first time in major league history that back-to-back no-hitters had been pitched in the same series.

Like most pitchers, Perry was not renowned for his hitting ability, and in his sophomore season of 1963, his manager Alvin Dark is said to have joked, "There would be a man on the moon before Gaylord Perry would hit a home run." There are other variants on the story, but either way, on July 20, 1969, just an hour after the Apollo 11 spacecraft carrying Neil Armstrong and Buzz Aldrin landed on the Moon, Perry hit the first home run of his career.

In 1969, Perry led the league in innings pitched, but the Giants finished second in the pennant race for the fifth straight season. Perry took over as the Giants' ace in 1970, and led the league both in wins (23) and innings pitched (328). Perry's strong 1970 performance salvaged the Giants' season, helping them finish above .500 but in third place. In 1971, the Giants finally won their division, with Perry posting a 2.76 ERA. In what would be his only trip to the postseason, Perry won Game 1 of the National League Championship Series but lost the decisive Game 4 against the Pittsburgh Pirates.

Cleveland Indians (1972–1975)
Before the 1972 season, the Giants traded the then 33-year-old Perry and shortstop Frank Duffy to the Cleveland Indians for 29-year-old flamethrower Sam McDowell, the ace of the Indians' staff. Perry went 24–16 in 1972 with a 1.92 ERA and one save, winning his first Cy Young Award. He remained the only Cy Young winner for Cleveland until CC Sabathia in 2007.

By the 1973 season, Perry was widely suspected of throwing a spitball. That season, Bobby Murcer of the New York Yankees publicly criticized Bowie Kuhn, the Commissioner of Baseball, and Joe Cronin, the president of the American League, for lacking the "guts" to enforce Rule 8.02, which banned the spitball; in response, Kuhn fined Murcer $250 (equivalent to $ today). After losing a game to Perry, Billy Martin, manager of the Detroit Tigers, told reporters that he instructed his pitchers to throw a spitball, leading to Cronin suspending Martin for three games. Publicly, Perry insisted that the pitch was a "hard slider".

After the 1973 season, Perry approached Bob Sudyk, sportswriter for the Cleveland Press, about co-authoring an autobiography. Sudyk said that Perry would have to be willing to discuss the rumors that he threw a spitball, and Perry agreed. Phil Seghi, the general manager of the Indians, tried to dissuade Perry from sharing his secrets, but was unsuccessful. Perry showed Sudyk how he threw spitballs with substances like Vaseline and K-Y Jelly, and a "puffball" using rosin dust. Perry also showed Sudyk how he hid additives on his uniform and body. The book, titled Me and the Spitter, was released in 1974.

Before the 1974 season, Major League Baseball added to Rule 8.02, now nicknamed "Gaylord's Rule", allowing umpires to call an automatic ball if they suspected a spitball, and eject the pitcher on the second offense. During spring training, the Indians acquired Perry's brother Jim from the Tigers as part of a three-team trade including the Yankees. Gaylord Perry was named AL Player of the Month in June 1974, after winning six complete games. In July, he started for the AL in the All-Star Game, the only time he started the game, but he got no decision in the AL's 7–2 loss. Perry won 21 games in 1974, and was Cleveland's last 20-game winner until Cliff Lee in 2008; his brother added 17 wins, with the pair accounting for half of the team's 77 victories.

Perry feuded with player-manager Frank Robinson after Robinson was acquired during the 1974 season. Perry told the press that he wanted to earn "one dollar more" than Robinson's $173,000 salary. They also feuded over Robinson's training regimen during spring training in 1975. Perry began the 1975 season with a 6–9 record and a 3.55 ERA through mid-June. In May, the Indians traded Jim Perry to the Oakland Athletics after he began the season with a 1–6 record and 6.69 ERA; it would turn out to be his final major league season.

Texas Rangers (1975–1977)
On June 13, 1975, at the start of a three-game series with the Texas Rangers, the Indians traded Perry to the Rangers in exchange for pitchers Jim Bibby, Jackie Brown, and Rick Waits. Perry won 12 games for the Rangers with a 3.03 ERA during the remainder of 1975.

In 1976, Perry had a 15–14 record and a 3.24 ERA. The Rangers protected Perry in the expansion draft after the season. In 1977, the Rangers surged to second place in the AL West. Perry again won 15 games, this time against only 12 defeats, in a rotation that included Doyle Alexander, Bert Blyleven, and Dock Ellis.

San Diego Padres (1978–79)
Before the 1978 season, the Rangers traded Perry to the San Diego Padres in exchange for middle reliever Dave Tomlin and $125,000. In the final game of the 1978 season, Perry recorded his 3,000th strikeout, becoming the third pitcher to do so after Walter Johnson and Bob Gibson. Perry won the Cy Young Award, after going 21–6 for San Diego, becoming the first pitcher to win the Cy Young Award in both leagues.

In 1979, Perry posted a 3.05 ERA and a 12–11 record before quitting the team on September 5, saying he would retire unless the club traded him back to Texas. The Padres traded Perry to the Texas Rangers on February 15, 1980, with minor leaguers Tucker Ashford and Joe Carroll for first baseman Willie Montañez.

Texas Rangers / New York Yankees (1980)
In 1980, Perry posted a 6–9 record and 3.43 ERA in 24 games with Texas before being traded to the Yankees on August 13, 1980, for minor leaguers Ken Clay and a player to be named later (Marvin Thompson). Many Yankees players had complained about Perry during his stints with the Rangers, and the club even used a special camera team to monitor his movements during one of his starts at Yankee Stadium. Perry finished the season with a 4–4 record for the Yankees. but did not pitch in the team's trip to the AL Championship Series.

Atlanta Braves (1981)
Perry's contract was up after the 1980 season and he signed a one-year, $300,000 contract with the Atlanta Braves for the 1981 season. During the strike-shortened 1981 season, Perry, the oldest player at the time in Major League baseball, started 23 games ( innings) and had an 8–9 record. The Braves released Perry after the season, leaving him three victories short of 300.

Seattle Mariners / Kansas City Royals (1982–83)
After being released by the Braves, Perry was unable to find interest from any clubs during the offseason, and missed his first spring training in 23 years. He eventually signed with the Seattle Mariners, where he acquired the nickname "Ancient Mariner." Perry won his 300th game on May 6, 1982, becoming the first pitcher to win 300 games since Early Wynn did so in 1963. On August 23, he was ejected from a game against the Boston Red Sox for doctoring the ball, and given a ten-day suspension. It was the second time Perry had been ejected in his entire career, and it was his first ejection for ball doctoring.

After starting the 1983 season 3–10, Perry was designated for assignment by Seattle on June 26 and the Kansas City Royals picked him on a waiver claim ten days later. In August, Perry became the third pitcher in history to record 3,500 strikeouts. In the final months of the season, Perry experimented with a submarine delivery for the first time in his career and took a no-hitter into the eighth inning against the first-place Baltimore Orioles on August 19.

In August 1983, Perry became the third pitcher in the same year to surpass longtime strikeout king Walter Johnson's record of 3,509 strikeouts. Steve Carlton and Nolan Ryan were the others. Also in 1983, Perry was involved in the Pine Tar Game against the New York Yankees. The game originally ended when the umpires called George Brett out for too much pine tar on his bat, negating his home run and drawing a vehement protest from him and the Royals. Perry absconded with Brett's bat and gave it to a bat boy so he could hide it in the clubhouse, only to be caught by Joe Brinkman. When the Royals won the protest, Perry was retroactively ejected for doing this.

Perry announced his retirement on September 23, 1983. He finished his MLB career with 314 wins, a 3.11 ERA, and 3,534 strikeouts. He threw 303 complete games.

Post-playing career

Perry retired to his  farm in Martin County, North Carolina, where he grew tobacco and peanuts, but had to file for bankruptcy in 1986. He briefly worked for Fiesta Foods as a sales manager, and later in the year Limestone College in Gaffney, South Carolina, chose Perry to be the college's first baseball coach. Perry was there until 1991 when he retired. In 1998, Perry was inducted into the Limestone College Athletics Hall of Fame (Class of 1998). He later moved to Spruce Pine, North Carolina.

Perry supported the Republican Party. He campaigned for Jesse Helms and contemplated a bid for Congress himself in 1986.

Honors
In 1991, his third year of eligibility, Perry was elected to the National Baseball Hall of Fame. In 1999, he was a finalist for the Major League Baseball All-Century Team. In 1998, The Sporting News ranked him 97th on their list of the 100 Greatest Baseball Players. Bill James lists Perry as having the tenth best career of any right-handed starting pitcher, and the 50th greatest player at any position. 

On July 23, 2005, the Giants retired Perry's uniform number 36. Perry was inducted into the Bay Area Sports Hall of Fame on March 9, 2009. Perry was honored on April 9, 2011, at AT&T Park with a 2010 World Series ring along with other San Francisco Giants greats Willie McCovey, Orlando Cepeda, and Willie Mays. He was honored again on April 7, 2013, with Mays and Juan Marichal receiving a 2012 World Series ring, and on April 18, 2015, with a 2014 World Series ring along with Mays, McCovey, Cepeda, and Marichal. The Indians invited Perry to throw the ceremonial first pitch before their Opening Day game for the 2015 season. On August 13, 2016, the Giants unveiled a bronze statue of Perry at the corner of Second and King streets outside of AT&T Park.

Personal life
Perry's wife, Blanche Manning Perry, died on September 11, 1987, when a car ran a stop sign and hit her car broadside on U.S. Route 27 in Lake Wales, Florida. Perry and Blanche had three daughters and one son. Their son, Jack, died of leukemia on June 18, 2005. In 1988, Perry launched the baseball program at Limestone College (now Limestone University) in Gaffney, South Carolina, and his son Jack was an inaugural team member. Jack was an accomplished pitcher and was posthumously inducted into the Limestone University Athletics Hall of Fame in 2017. Jack pitched three seasons at Limestone under his father's coaching and is the only player in team history to throw a no-hitter  achieving a no-hitter twice within two weeks during the 1990 season. Perry's nephew, Chris, is a professional golfer on the PGA Tour.

Perry contracted COVID-19 in 2021 and never fully recovered. He died at home on December 1, 2022, at age 84.

Publications

See also
 300 win club
 3000 strikeout club
 List of Major League Baseball career wins leaders
 List of Major League Baseball no-hitters
 List of Major League Baseball annual wins leaders
 List of Texas Rangers Opening Day starting pitchers
 Top 100 Major League Baseball hit batsmen leaders
 Top 100 Major League Baseball strikeout pitchers

References

External links

 

1938 births
2022 deaths
Major League Baseball pitchers
San Francisco Giants players
Cleveland Indians players
Texas Rangers players
San Diego Padres players
Seattle Mariners players
Atlanta Braves players
Kansas City Royals players
New York Yankees players
National Baseball Hall of Fame inductees
Cy Young Award winners
National League All-Stars
American League All-Stars
American League wins champions
National League wins champions
Major League Baseball players with retired numbers
Baseball players from North Carolina
Corpus Christi Giants players
Rio Grande Valley Giants players
St. Cloud Rox players
Tacoma Giants players
Limestone Saints baseball coaches
Campbell Fighting Camels baseball players
American sportsmen
American autobiographers
People from Spruce Pine, North Carolina
People from Williamston, North Carolina